Douglass Cecil North (November 5, 1920 – November 23, 2015) was an American economist known for his work in economic history. He was the co-recipient (with Robert William Fogel) of the 1993 Nobel Memorial Prize in Economic Sciences.  In the words of the Nobel Committee, North and Fogel "renewed research in economic history by applying economic theory and quantitative methods in order to explain economic and institutional change."

Biography
Douglass North was born in Cambridge, Massachusetts, on November 5, 1920. He moved several times as a child due to his father's work at MetLife. The family lived in Ottawa, Lausanne, New York City, and Wallingford, Connecticut.

North was educated at Ashbury College in Ottawa, Ontario and the Choate School in Wallingford, Connecticut. He was accepted at Harvard at the same time that his father became the head of MetLife on the west coast, so North opted to go to University of California, Berkeley. During his time at Berkeley, North was a member of the Chi Phi Fraternity. In 1942, he graduated with a B.A. degree in General Curriculum-Humanities. Although his grades amounted to slightly better than a "C" average, he managed to complete a triple major in political science, philosophy and economics. That same year, he entered the US Merchant Marine Academy, graduated a year later and went to sea for three years as a deck officer.

A conscientious objector in World War II, North became a navigator in the Merchant Marine, traveling between San Francisco and Australia. During that time, he read economics and picked up his hobby of photography. He taught navigation at the Maritime Service Officers' School in Alameda during the last year of the war, and struggled with the decision of whether to become a photographer or an economist.

North returned to UC Berkeley where he obtained a Ph.D. degree in economics in 1952. He subsequently began to work as an assistant professor at the University of Washington.

North died on November 23, 2015, at his summer home in Benzonia, Michigan from esophageal cancer at the age of 95.

Academic career

From 1951 to 1956, North was an assistant professor of economics at the University of Washington, then from 1956 to 1960, an associate professor.  In 1960 North became co-editor of the Journal of Economic History, popularizing Cliometrics (New Economic History), and from 1960 to 1983 he was professor of economics at the University of Washington where he also served as the chair of the economics department from 1967 to 1979.  In 1979 he served as the Peterkin Professor of Political Economy at Rice University, and in 1981–82 as the Pitt Professor of American History and Institutions at Cambridge University, before joining the faculty of Washington University in St. Louis in 1983 as the Henry R. Luce Professor of Law and Liberty in the Department of Economics (where he also served as director of the center for Political Economy from 1984 to 1990).  He was the Bartlett Burnap Senior Fellow at the Hoover Institution at Stanford University.

In 1991, he became the first economic historian to win the John R. Commons Award, which was established by the International Honors Society for Economics in 1965.

A collection of North's papers is housed at the Rubenstein Library at Duke University.

Research agenda
Along with Ronald Coase and Oliver Williamson, he helped found the International Society for the New Institutional Economics (ISNIE) which held its first meeting in St. Louis in 1997. His research included property rights, transaction costs, the institutional basis of markets, and economic organization in history as well as economic development in developing countries.

North served as an expert for the Copenhagen Consensus and as an advisor to governments around the world.  He was engaged in research (with John J. Wallis of the University of Maryland and Barry Weingast of Stanford University) on how countries emerge from what they call "the natural state" and into long-run economic growth.  He was a trustee of the Economists for Peace and Security and a special adviser to the non-profit organization Vipani.

Publications

Institutions 
In 1991 Douglass North published a paper, entitled 'Institutions,' in the Journal of Economic Perspectives. This paper summarized much of his earlier research relating to economic and institutional change. North defines institutions as "humanly devised constraints that structure political, economic and social interactions". Constraints, as North describes, are devised as formal rules (constitutions, laws, property rights) and informal restraints (sanctions, taboos, customs, traditions, codes of conduct), which usually contribute to the perpetuation of order and safety within a market or society. The degree to which they are effective is subject to varying circumstances, such as a government's limited coercive force, a lack of organized state, or the presence of strong religious precept.

Section 2 of North's 1991 paper describes the economic development of societies as occurring in stages:

North begins with local exchange within the village. In this setting, specialization "is rudimentary and self-sufficiency characterizes most individual households", with small-scale village trade existing within dense social networks of informal constraints that facilitate local exchange, and a relatively low transaction cost. However, this confined market reduces the potential of specialization and increases production costs. In this close-knit network "people have an intimate understanding of each other, and the threat of violence is a continuous force for preserving order ..."

With growth, the market extends beyond the village into larger, interconnected regions. As the participants of a transaction become more socially distant, the terms of exchange must be made more explicit. This increase in transaction costs necessitates institutions that reduce the risks of being cheated, either by raising "the benefits of cooperative solutions or the costs of defection". With increased specialization, production costs are reduced and can justify higher transaction costs.

As long-distance trade becomes more feasible, generally through caravans or lengthy ship voyages, individuals and groups experience occupational and geographic specialization. Society also experiences a rise of formal trading centers (temporary gathering places, towns or cities). From the development of long-distance trade arise two transactional cost problems.

The first transactional cost problem is agency: the transfer of one's goods or services outside the control of local rule leaves the rules of exchange undefined, the risk of unfair trade high, and the contracts within society unenforced. For this reason, sedentary merchants often would send their kin with the product to ensure its safe arrival and the fulfillment of agreed terms of exchange by the receiving party.

The second transactional cost problem is the enforcement of contracts. Historically this problem was met with either armed forces protecting ships or caravans, or use of tolls by local coercive groups. However, in modern societies, institutions acting cooperatively in the interest of free market trade provide protection for goods and enforcement of contracts. Negotiation and enforcement in alien parts of the world require the development of a standardized system of weights and measures.

As development continues, the rise of capital markets (and the protection of associated property rights), creates social capital and enables citizens to gain wealth. Technology plays an instrumental role in the continued development of manufacturing sectors, and acts to lower transaction costs in several ways. The most substantial benefits are generally the result of transportation improvements.

Eventually, society becomes overwhelmingly urban. This final stage of development specialization requires increasing percentages of the resources of the society to be active in the market so that the transaction sector becomes a large share of gross national product. Highly specialized forms of transaction organizations emerge at this stage. Globalized specialization and division of labor demand institutions to ensure property rights even when trading in neighboring countries enabling capital markets to develop "with credible commitment on the part of the players."

North enumerates three primitive types of exchange:
 Tribal Society "relies on a dense social network".(Colson 1974, p. 59)
 Bazaars "high measurement costs; continuous effort at clientization; intensive bargaining at every margin"
 Long-distance caravan trade illustrates the informal constraints that made trade possible in a world where protection was essential and no organized state existed.
All three methods above are found to be much less likely to evolve than large urban societies.

North's paper concludes with a few intriguing questions which his paper aimed to address:
 What is it about informal constraints that give them such a pervasive  influence upon the long-run character of economies?
 What is the relationship between formal and informal constraints?
 How does an economy develop the informal constraints that make  individuals constrain their behavior so that they make political and judicial systems effective forces for third party enforcement?

Transaction Costs, Institutions, and Economic Performance 
In a 1992 paper, North argues that neoclassical economic theory overlooks the institutions required to create efficient markets with low monitoring and transaction costs. He develops a framework for explaining how institutions change and become more efficient over time.

North theorizes that all transaction costs are rooted in information asymmetries between the parties to an exchange. Hence, each person must expend resources ascertaining the qualities of the good she is buying and enforcing the terms of the trade. Because these costs pose such a large barrier to economic growth, a central function of political and economic institutions is to control them, often by disincentivizing fraud, theft, and other socially detrimental behaviors. Yet those who command the political system will structure these institutions to maximize their personal benefit, rather than the social benefit, so transaction costs will not always be minimized by existing institutions.

Importantly for North, individuals and organizations make their decisions on the basis of imperfect ideologies, which are "mental models" for how the world functions. Therefore, the politicians who craft institutions will, despite their best efforts, occasionally fail to maximize their personal gain. When this happens, entrepreneurs who believe that institutional changes will significantly benefit them will enter the political realm to effect this change. The result is incremental institutional change, pushed forward by self-seeking individuals.

North argues that this change will usually be slow for two reasons. First, the powerful actors in control of the political systems made the institutions for their benefit and so will be reluctant to change them, resulting in path dependence. Second, informal institutions—like social customs and cultural practices—are by their nature slow to change, yet play a role in determining transaction costs.

North goes on to apply this framework to analyze a few historical examples, including the Green Revolution, the American Revolution, and imperial Spain, as well as to offer some general policy recommendations.

Violence and the Rise of Open-Access Orders
In Violence and the Rise of Open-Access Orders, North, Wallis, and Weingast integrate a theory of politics with a theory of economics to explain the institutions, i.e. the rules governing behavior, that develop in human societies. In their view, the primary task of any set of institutions is to limit violence among individuals. They focus on two sets of institutions—which they call social orders—that accomplish this task, but which also have different effects on economic growth.

The first set of institutions are called "limited access orders," and they are characterized by elite control of the political and economic systems to extract rents. Violence is limited because the most powerful actors maintain law and order to protect their rents. However, their means of maintaining law and order require supporting economic and political monopolies, which stunt economic growth.

The second set of institutions that North et al. propose are called "open access orders," and they limit violence through a politically controlled military. These societies allow anyone who meets some impersonal criteria to form political and economic organizations, resulting in a Schumpeterian process of "creative destruction." The military limits societal violence, and the political actors that control this military are themselves constrained by the constant competition for political and economic power that this process of creative destruction entails. Unlike limited access orders, open access orders stimulate economic growth since solutions to economic and political challenges can come from any individual in society, rather than a select few.

North et al. argue that modern open access orders emerged from limited access orders through a two-step process: first, the application of impersonal laws to elites and the consolidation of military power, and second, the extension of elite privileges to the rest of society. They apply this theory to explain the legitimacy of elections within different societies and to explain why economic growth is more consistent in modern open access orders than it is in limited access orders.

Personal life

North was married twice. His first marriage, to Lois Heister in 1944, resulted in three sons: Douglass Jr., Christopher and Malcolm. During the marriage, Heister became a notable activist and politician. The marriage ended in divorce. North remarried in 1972, to Elisabeth Case.

Legacy
As a Nobel prize winner, North's reputation extended both from his own university environment to the international influences made by his research and writing. North's research in New Economic History has included such notable economists and historians as Jonathan Hughes, Richard Sutch, Lloyd Mercer, Jim Sheperd, Donald Gordon, Gary Walton, Lance E. Davis, Robert Huttenback, Roger Ransom, Gaston Rimlinger, Terry L. Anderson, P.J. Hill, Philip Coelho, and David Knowles as recorded in the 60th Anniversary dedication volume in memory of North.

Publications 
North's other major publications include:
 
 
 The Economic Growth of the United States, 1790–1860, Prentice Hall, 1961.
 
 Institutional Change and American Economic Growth, Cambridge University Press, 1971 (with Lance Davis).
 The Rise of the Western World: A New Economic History, 1973 (with Robert Thomas).
 Growth and Welfare in the American Past, Prentice-Hall, 1974.
 Structure and Change in Economic History, Norton, 1981 .
 
 Constitutions and Commitment: The Evolution of Institutions Governing Public Choice in Seventeenth-Century England, Cambridge University Press, 1989
 Institutions, Institutional Change and Economic Performance, Cambridge University Press, 1990 .
  Also published as Nobel Prize Lecture.
 Empirical Studies in Institutional Change, Cambridge University Press, 1996 (edited with Lee Alston & Thrainn Eggertsson) .
 Understanding the Process of Economic Change, Princeton University Press, 2005 .
 Violence and Social Orders: A Conceptual Framework for Interpreting Recorded Human History, Cambridge University Press, 2009 (with John Joseph Wallis and Barry R. Weingast) .

References

Further reading
 Colson, Elizabeth. Tradition and Contract: The Problem of Order. Chicago: Adeline Publishing, 1974.
 S. Galiani and I. Sened (eds.), 2014. Institutions, property rights and economic growth: The legacy of Douglass North, Cambridge University Press.  http://econweb.umd.edu/~galiani/b-north.html
 Kevin Bryan. 2015. Douglass North, an economist’s historian. Voxeu.
 John Wallis. 2015. Structure and change in economic history: The ideas of Douglass North. Voxeu.

External links

 
 Hoover Institution homepage
 
 
 
 Douglass North: The NIE and Development. Essay (~ 1995), 8 p.

1920 births
2015 deaths
Academics of the University of Cambridge
American economic historians
American sailors
American Nobel laureates
Nobel laureates in Economics
Choate Rosemary Hall alumni
Fellows of Girton College, Cambridge
University of California, Berkeley alumni
New institutional economists
Washington University in St. Louis faculty
People from Cambridge, Massachusetts
University of Washington faculty
People from Benzie County, Michigan
Distinguished Fellows of the American Economic Association
Social Science Research Council
Economists from Michigan
Economists from Massachusetts
Nobel laureates affiliated with Missouri
American expatriates in Canada
Rice University faculty
Stanford University faculty